Samuel Taitazak was a Talmudist who lived at Salonica in the 16th century. He was a member of the Taitazak family. He was the author of She'elot u-Teshubot, responsa, some of which have been included in Judah Taitazak's She'erit Yehudah and in Samuel de Medina's collection of responsa.

Jewish Encyclopedia bibliography 
 David Conforte, Ḳore ha-Dorot, p. 38a;
 Azulai, Shem ha-Gedolim, i. 88;
 Moritz Steinschneider, Cat. Bodl. Col. 2481.S

Rabbis from Thessaloniki
16th-century rabbis from the Ottoman Empire